Kauf is a surname. Notable people with the surname include:

 Jaelin Kauf (born 1996), American freestyle skier
 Rüdiger Kauf (born 1975), German footballer

See also
 Kaif
 Kauf (musician), American musician